Sallie Watson "Penny" Chisholm (born 1947) is an American biological oceanographer at the Massachusetts Institute of Technology. She is an expert in the ecology and evolution of ocean microbes. Her research focuses particularly on the most abundant marine phytoplankton, Prochlorococcus, that she discovered in the 1980s with Rob Olson and other collaborators. She has a TED talk about their discovery and importance called "The tiny creature that secretly powers the planet".

Early life and education 

Chisholm was born in Marquette, Michigan and graduated from Marquette Senior High School in 1965. She attended Skidmore College and earned a PhD from SUNY Albany in 1974. Following her Ph.D., she served as a post-doctoral researcher at the Scripps Institution of Oceanography from 1974 to 1976.

Career 
Chisholm has been a faculty member at the Massachusetts Institute of Technology since 1976 and a visiting scientist at the Woods Hole Oceanographic Institution since 1978. Her research has focused on the ecology of marine phytoplankton. Chisholm's early work focused on the processes by which such plankton take up nutrients and the manner in which this affects their life cycle on diurnal time scales. This led her to begin using flow cytometry which can be used to measure the properties of individual cells.

The application of flow cytometry to environmental samples led Chisholm and her collaborators (most notably Rob Olson and Heidi Sosik) to the discovery that small plankton (in particular Prochlorococcus and Synechococcus) accounted for a much more substantial part of marine productivity than had previously been realized. Previously, biological oceanographers had focused on silicaceous diatoms as being the most important phytoplankton, accounting for 10–20 gigatons of carbon uptake each year. Chisholm's work showed that an even larger amount of carbon was cycled through these small algae, which may also play an important role in the global nitrogen cycle.

In recent years, Chisholm has played a visible role in opposing the use of iron fertilization as a technological fix for anthropogenic climate change.

Awards and honors 
Chisholm has been a member of the United States National Academy of Sciences (NAS) since 2003 and a fellow of the American Academy of Arts and Sciences since 1992.

In January 2010, she was awarded the Alexander Agassiz Medal, for "pioneering studies of the dominant photosynthetic organisms in the sea and for integrating her results into a new understanding of the global ocean."

She was a co-recipient in 2012 of the Ruth Patrick Award from the Association for the Sciences of Limnology and Oceanography.

Chisholm received the National Medal of Science from President Barack Obama on February 1, 2013.

In 2013, she was awarded the Ramon Margalef Prize in Ecology, "for being one of the most productive, charismatic and active researchers on biology and marine ecology".

On May 24, 2018, she was awarded the Doctor of Science degree by Harvard University.

In 2019 she received the Crafoord Prize in Biosciences, "for the discovery and pioneering studies of the most abundant photosynthesising organism on Earth, Prochlorococcus". This prize is considered equivalent to the Nobel Prize (for which there is no Biosciences category). Chisholm was honored at the Crafoord Prize Symposium in Biosciences at which 6 internationally prominent scientists spoke (in order of presentations): Alexandra Worden (GEOMAR Helmholtz Centre for Ocean Research Kiel, Germany), Corina Brussaard (NIOZ Royal Netherlands Institute for Sea Research, The Netherlands), Ramunas Stepanauskas (Bigelow Laboratory for Ocean Sciences, USA), Rachel Foster (Stockholm University, Sweden), Francis M. Martin (INRA French National Institute for Agricultural Research, France) and David Karl (University of Hawaii, USA).

Select works 
Chisholm, S.W.  2012. Unveiling Prochlorococcus:  The Life and times of the ocean's smallest photosynthetic cell.  2012.  In:  Microbes and Evolution: The World That Darwin Never Saw. In: R. Kolter and S. Maloy [eds].  ASM Press. p. 165.

See also 
Prochlorococcus
Synechococcus
 Carbon cycle
 Global warming

References

External links 
 Chisholm Lab at MIT
 Online Chisholm Lecture
 Video of Chisholm talking about her work, from the National Science & Technology Medals Foundation

1947 births
Living people
People from Marquette, Michigan
American marine biologists
American oceanographers
Sustainability advocates
American women biologists
Skidmore College alumni
University at Albany, SUNY alumni
Massachusetts Institute of Technology School of Science faculty
Members of the United States National Academy of Sciences
Winners of the Ramon Margalef Prize in Ecology
Fellows of the Ecological Society of America
Biogeochemists
Women oceanographers
Fellows of the American Academy of Microbiology
American women academics
20th-century American biologists
20th-century earth scientists
20th-century American academics
20th-century American women scientists
21st-century American biologists
21st-century earth scientists
21st-century American academics
21st-century American women scientists
Scientists from Michigan